Bulldog Drummond in Africa is a 1938 American adventure crime film. This was the 13th of 25 in the Bulldog Drummond film series from 1922 to 1969.

Plot summary
Again on the eve of his wedding, Captain Hugh Drummond (John Howard) has more pressing concerns when he sets off from London for Spanish-Morocco, because his fiancée Phillis Clavering (Heather Angel) has seen Colonel Nielsen (H.B. Warner) from Scotland Yard being kidnapped by an international criminal gang. Their intent is to force him to reveal the secrets of the British Empire's latest military technology. With his fiancée (Heather Angel), chum 'Algy' (Reginald Denny), & valet 'Tenny' Tennyson (E.E. Clive) in tow, Bulldog outwits Scotland Yard's bureaucratic blundering, flies his own plane 1200 miles only to find more bureaucratic blundering by the local British Consul ordering him home without delay. Drummond and his friends aren't easy to get rid of, however; they soon mount a rescue plan, eventually liberating Colonel Nielsen and throwing the villainous ringleader to his own pet lions.

Cast
 John Howard as Capt. Hugh Chesterton "Bulldog" Drummond
 Heather Angel as Phyllis Clavering
 H.B. Warner as Col. J.A. Nielson
 J. Carrol Naish as Richard Lane
 Reginald Denny as Algernon "Algy" Longworth
 E.E. Clive as "Tenny" Tennyson
 Anthony Quinn as Fordine (a henchman)
 Michael Brooke as Baron Nevsky
 Matthew Boulton as Major Grey
 Neil Fitzgerald as McTurk (a British spy)

References

External links
 
 
 
 
 

Films based on Bulldog Drummond
1938 films
American mystery films
1930s English-language films
American black-and-white films
1938 adventure films
Films set in Morocco
American crime thriller films
1930s mystery films
1930s crime thriller films
Films directed by Louis King
1930s American films